Hansjörg Ashenwald (born 28 June 1965) is an Austrian nordic combined skier who competed during the late 1980s and early 1990s. He won a bronze medal in the 3 x 10 km team event at the 1988 Winter Olympics in Calgary.

External links 
 
 

Living people
Austrian male Nordic combined skiers
1965 births
Nordic combined skiers at the 1988 Winter Olympics
Olympic bronze medalists for Austria
Olympic medalists in Nordic combined
Medalists at the 1988 Winter Olympics